Pat Lennon (born 1932) is an Irish hurler who played as a right wing-back for the Kilkenny senior team.

Born in Callan, County Kilkenny, Lennon first arrived on the inter-county scene at the age of seventeen when he first linked up with the Kilkenny minor team. He made his senior debut during the 1954 championship. Lennon went on to play a brief role for Kilkenny.

At club level Lennon is a one-time championship medallist with John Locke's. He began his club career with Graigue.

Throughout his career Lennon made just one championship appearance for Kilkenny.

Honours

Team

Graigue
Kilkenny Minor Hurling Championship (1): 1949

John Locke's
Kilkenny Senior Hurling Championship (1): 1957

Kilkenny
All-Ireland Minor Hurling Championship (1): 1950
Leinster Minor Hurling Championship (1): 1950

References

1932 births
Living people
John Locke's hurlers
Kilkenny inter-county hurlers